The 1981 Family Circle Cup was a women's tennis tournament played on outdoor clay courts at the Sea Pines Racquet Club on Hilton Head Island, South Carolina in the United States that was part of the 1981 Avon Championships World Championship Series. It was the ninth edition of the tournament and was held from April 7 through April 12, 1981. First-seeded Chris Evert won the singles title and earned $30,000 first-prize money.

Finals

Singles
 Chris Evert defeated  Pam Shriver 6–3, 6–2
 It was Evert's 3rd singles title of the year and the 104th of her career.

Doubles
 Rosemary Casals /  'Wendy Turnbull defeated  Mima Jaušovec /  Pam Shriver 7–5, 7–5

Prize money

References

External links
 Women's Tennis Association (WTA) tournament edition details
 International Tennis Federation (ITF) tournament edition details

Charleston Open
1981 WTA Tour
Family Circle Cup
Family Circle Cup
Family Circle Cup